Cyperus almensis is a species of sedge that is native to Brazil.

See also 
 List of Cyperus species

References 

almensis
Plants described in 1993
Flora of Brazil